Stanly Community College (SCC) is a public community college in Albemarle, North Carolina. It is part of the North Carolina Community College System. It has a satellite campus in Locust, North Carolina and is accredited by the Southern Association of Colleges and Schools (SACS). The college serves over 10,000 students annually in associate degree, diploma, certificate, general education, occupational training, adult literacy, and a comprehensive online degree program.

References

External links
Official website

Two-year colleges in the United States
Vocational education in the United States
North Carolina Community College System colleges
Education in Stanly County, North Carolina
Universities and colleges accredited by the Southern Association of Colleges and Schools
Buildings and structures in Stanly County, North Carolina